The Dr. John Owen Campbell House is a historic house in Lebanon, Tennessee, U.S.. It was built from 1841 to 1843 for B. W. G. Winford. It was designed in the Greek Revival architectural style. It remained in the Winford family until 1906, when Winford's son-in-law, B. F. Lester, sold it to Dr. John Owen Campbell, the son of Tennessee Governor William Bowen Campbell. It was later acquired by Herbert C. Ruck. It has been listed on the National Register of Historic Places since December 8, 1980.

References

Houses on the National Register of Historic Places in Tennessee
Greek Revival architecture in Tennessee
Houses completed in 1841
Houses in Wilson County, Tennessee